Hwang Hee (born Kim Ji-soo; October 18, 1988) is a South Korean actor. He is known for his roles in the television series Tomorrow, with You (2017), Arthdal Chronicles (2019), and Doctor John (2019).

Filmography

Film

Television series

Variety show

Theater

Awards and nominations

References

External links 
 
 

1988 births
Living people
South Korean male television actors
South Korean male stage actors
South Korean male film actors
21st-century South Korean male actors
Kyung Hee University alumni